Pyershamayski District is an administrative subdivision of the city of Minsk, Belarus. It was named after the First of May.

Geography
The district is situated in the north-eastern area of the city and borders with Savyetski and Partyzanski districts.

Main sights
The National Library of Belarus is located in the district. Its octagonal structure is present in the coat of arms. In Chelyuskinites Park the "Children's Railroad" is located.

Transport
The district is served by the Maskoŭskaja subway line. It is also crossed by the MKAD beltway .

References

External links
 Pyershamayski District official website

Districts of Minsk